Atlantic Airways (Faroese: Atlantsflog) is the national airline of the Faroe Islands, operating domestic helicopter services and international passenger services as well as search and rescue responsibilities from its base at Vágar Airport, on the Faroese island of Vágar. Most of its pilots are members of the Faroese Pilot Association. Its 2021 revenue was 410.2mm DKK.

History
Regular air links to the Faroes had been in operation since 1963, between the islands and Denmark. Although the airport at Vágar had been constructed by the British Army during World War II, air traffic to the islands was practically non-existent between the departure of the British and the start of services to Copenhagen. Calls for the creation of a Faroese airline company began in the early 1980s. Passenger numbers were steadily increasing and Danish carrier Maersk Air enjoyed the monopoly as the sole airline to serve the Faroe Islands.

As a result, Atlantic Airways was established in 1987, initially between the Faroese government (51%) and Danish airline Cimber Air (49%), though the Faroese government would assume full ownership in 1989. Flights commenced between Vágar and Copenhagen on 28 March 1988 using a British Aerospace 146. A hangar was built at Vágar by the Faroese government in order to secure Atlantic Airways' home base in the Faroes, ensuring maintenance facilities were available on the islands.

The aim of the new airline company was to build up a Faroese aviation industry on a commercial basis and to ensure the Faroe Islands an air connection with the outside world. Flight crews and management were Faroese.

Though load factors were high and the new service was popular, Atlantic Airways had a turbulent beginning economically. The Faroe Islands suffered a severe economic depression in the early 1990s, and at its nadir in 1992, the Faroese government delivered 75 m DKK in aid to the struggling carrier. Atlantic Airways would not become profitable until 1995.

Flights were launched to Reykjavík in 1995 in co-operation with Air Iceland, and also to Narsarsuaq in Greenland in the summer months, in co-operation with Air Iceland. The latter half of the 1990s saw Billund in Denmark and Aberdeen in the UK added to Atlantic Airways' flight schedule.

The growing list of destinations and increasing passenger numbers, together with the stabilisation of the airline's finances, saw a second BAe 146 added to the fleet in 2000. This new aircraft meant services to London Stansted in England and the Norwegian capital Oslo added to the network. Growth in tourism on the islands has also enabled flights to Aalborg, Stavanger, Stord and Edinburgh.  However, for the 2006 season services to Stord have been discontinued, and Edinburgh replaced by the Shetland Islands.  Atlantic Airways also entered the UK domestic market in 2006, becoming the only carrier to offer a direct service between Shetland and London, which it did on a twice weekly basis. The UK domestic operation ceased in 2008.

Atlantic Airways also operates a domestic service by helicopter, in many instances a vital connection to many of the islands, which otherwise can only be reached by sea. The helicopter has proved a vital tool on the islands since the 1960s, when helicopters from Danish coast guard vessels patrolling the Faroes undertook a variety of tasks, including ferrying equipment and supplies between the islands. The government hired a helicopter in 1978 for these tasks, but in the 1980s a commercial public helicopter service was launched linking each of the islands using two Bell 222 helicopters.

Initially, the helicopter service was a standalone company, SL Helicopters, but the decision to concentrate Faroese aviation into one firm led to the helicopter department becoming part of Atlantic Airways in 1994. The helicopters provide a round trip 'hopper' service to each of the islands, which is also ideal for tourists looking for aerial views. The company is required to have at least one helicopter operational and ready for search and rescue duties.

From approximately 2002 to 2007, Atlantic Airways has produced profits of between 8 and 13 million DKK. The company has increased its turnover from 120 million in 1998 to 520 million DKK in 2006. Atlantic Airways employed 177 people at January 2007. Atlantic Airways was listed at the Iceland Stock Exchange on 10 December 2007.

The Faroese government has decided on a privatisation process and has sold off 33% of the company in the first bidding round. The first day of trading was 10 December 2007.

The government was planning to sell off 33% more in 2008, but this was cancelled due to the financial crisis.

The first Airbus A319 for Atlantic Airways, registered OY-RCG, entered service in March 2012, with a modified livery. The runway at Vágar required an extension to properly accommodate this aircraft. The second and third Airbus 319s (OY-RCH and OY-RCI) entered service in May and October 2013 respectively. As the lease of these ran out by the end of 2016, only one was renewed while a brand new Airbus A320 was delivered.

On 3 June 2015, Jóhanna á Bergi became CEO of the company. She is the first woman to become CEO of a Nordic airline.

In December 2018, the airline submitted an application for commercial services to the United States.

On 13 March 2020, Atlantic Airways announced the suspension of all routes until 13 April 2020 except the route to Copenhagen due to the COVID-19 pandemic.

Destinations

International services
, Atlantic Airways serves the following scheduled destinations:

Charter operations
Atlantic Airways also operates charters for Danish tour operators to destinations such as Italy, Croatia, Bulgaria, France, Scotland, Norway and the Czech Republic, out of Copenhagen Kastrup and Billund airports.

Domestic services
There is domestic helicopter service to the islands. The helicopters depart from Vágar Airport on Sunday, Monday (only in June, July, & August), Wednesday, and Friday.

The flights visit the capital Tórshavn and second largest town Klaksvík, the southern islands Skúvoy, Stóra Dímun, Suðuroy (Froðba), the northern islands Svínoy and Fugloy (Hattarvík and Kirkja), the western island Mykines, and the island Koltur.

Codeshare agreements

Atlantic Airways currently has codeshare agreements with Air France and KLM.

Fleet
, the Atlantic Airways fleet consists of the following aircraft:

Fixed-Wing Fleet

Helicopter Fleet 

The AgustaWestland AW139 is the only primary helicopter used for flights to district villages. With a capacity to seat 15 passengers, the helicopter is used to shuttle passengers in the Faroe Islands.

Accidents and incidents
1989: an Atlantic Airways BAe 146–200 (registration OY-CRG) aircraft failed to stop at the end of the runway and was subsequently out of service for 3 weeks.
On the night 16–17 December 1992, a Bell 212 crashed in darkness and also because of bad visibility. Subsequently, all five people on board died. This was one of the Atlantic Airways helicopters, this time on an ambulance flight.
On 10 October 2006, Atlantic Airways Flight 670, a BAe 146–200 (registration OY-CRG) skidded off the runway at Stord Airport in Norway. Of the 12 passengers and 4 crew, 4 were killed and 12 survived with injuries. The aircraft had been chartered by Aker Kværner to fly personnel from Stavanger (Sola Airport) to Molde via Stord. The aircraft appears to have been unable to stop on the runway when its spoilers failed to extend during landing. The aircraft crossed the threshold and continued down a slope before coming to rest and catching fire.

References

External links

Official website

 
Airlines of the Faroe Islands
European Regions Airline Association
Helicopter airlines
Airlines established in 1987
1987 establishments in Denmark